Ecoregions in Australia are geographically distinct plant and animal communities, defined by the World Wide Fund for Nature based on geology, soils, climate, and predominant vegetation.

The World Wide Fund for Nature (WWF) identified 825 terrestrial ecoregions that cover the Earth's land surface, 40 of which cover Australia and its dependent islands. The WWF ecoregions are classified by biome type (tropical and subtropical moist broadleaf forests, temperate grasslands, savannas, and shrublands, tundra, etc.), and  into one of eight terrestrial realms. Australia, together with New Zealand, New Guinea and neighboring island groups, is part of the Australasian realm. The IBRA bioregions informed the delineation of the WWF ecoregions for Australia, and the WWF ecoregions generally follow the same ecoregion boundaries, while often clustering two or more similar bioregions into a larger ecoregion. The ecoregion articles in Wikipedia generally follow the WWF scheme.

The WWF ecoregions are based heavily upon the Interim Biogeographic Regionalisation for Australia (IBRA) regionalisation. Like the IBRA, it was developed for use as a planning tool for conservation science, with the goal of establishing a system of nature reserves in each of the ecoregions or bioregions sufficient to preserve biodiversity. Both systems also have a prioritization system for establishing preserves; the WWF designated its Global 200 ecoregions as priorities for conservation, and the Department of Environment and Heritage ranks its bioregions high, medium, or low priority, based on "the potential value land reservation in those regions would add to the development of a comprehensive, adequate and representative reserve system for Australia."

WWF terrestrial ecoregions
Tropical and subtropical moist broadleaf forests
Lord Howe Island subtropical forests
Norfolk Island subtropical forests
Queensland tropical rain forests
Temperate broadleaf and mixed forests
Eastern Australian temperate forests
Southeast Australia temperate forests
Tasmanian Central Highlands forests
Tasmanian temperate forests
Tasmanian temperate rain forests
Tropical and subtropical grasslands, savannas, and shrublands
Arnhem Land tropical savanna
Brigalow tropical savanna
Cape York Peninsula tropical savanna
Carpentaria tropical savanna
Einasleigh Uplands savanna
Kimberley tropical savanna
Mitchell Grass Downs
Southwest Australia savanna
Victoria Plains tropical savanna
Temperate grasslands, savannas, and shrublands
Eastern Australia mulga shrublands
Southeast Australia temperate savanna
Montane grasslands and shrublands
Australian Alps montane grasslands
Tundra
Antipodes Subantarctic Islands tundra (Australia, New Zealand)
Mediterranean forests, woodlands, and scrub
Coolgardie woodlands
Esperance mallee
Eyre and York mallee
Jarrah-Karri forest and shrublands
Swan Coastal Plain scrub and woodlands
Mount Lofty woodlands
Murray-Darling woodlands and mallee
Naracoorte woodlands
Southwest Australia woodlands
Deserts and xeric shrublands
Carnarvon xeric shrublands
Central Ranges xeric scrub
Gibson Desert
Great Sandy-Tanami desert
Great Victoria Desert
Nullarbor Plain xeric shrublands
Pilbara shrublands
Simpson Desert
Tirari–Sturt stony desert
Western Australian mulga shrublands

WWF terrestrial ecoregions and IBRA bioregions
This table shows which IBRA bioregions correspond to which WWF ecoregions.

WWF freshwater ecoregions
The WWF published Freshwater Ecoregions of the World, a global map of freshwater ecoregions. The WWF team identified ten freshwater ecoregions for Australia and Tasmania. A major habitat type, or biome, was identified for each ecoregion. The four major habitat types present in Australia are tropical and subtropical coastal rivers, temperate coastal rivers, temperate floodplain rivers and wetlands, 
and xeric freshwaters and endorheic (closed) basins. The Australian freshwater ecoregions were adapted from the freshwater fish biogeographic provinces identified by Peter Unmack and G.R. Allen, S.H. Midgley, and M. Allen, who were also part of the WWF team. The freshwater fish provinces "were derived through similarity analyses, parsimony analysis, and drainage-based plots of species ranges".

Tropical and subtropical coastal rivers
 Arafura–Carpentaria
 Kimberley

Temperate coastal rivers
 Bass Strait Drainages
 Eastern Coastal Australia
 Southern Tasmania 
 Southwestern Australia

Temperate floodplain rivers and wetlands
 Murray–Darling

Xeric freshwaters and endorheic (closed) basins
 Lake Eyre Basin
 Paleo
 Pilbara

See also

Environment of Australia

References

ecoregions
Ecoregions
 

IBRA regions
Ecoregions
Australia
ecoregions